Bigil is the soundtrack album, composed by A. R. Rahman, to the 2019 Indian Tamil-language sports action film of the same name, directed by Atlee Kumar, starring Vijay in dual lead roles, along with Nayanthara, Jackie Shroff, Vivek and Kathir in other prominent roles. The soundtrack album consists of 5 songs, with 2 bonus tracks, all of them were penned by lyricist Vivek. The soundtrack album was released digitally on 27 September 2019, through the Sony Music record label.

Production 
The soundtrack and background score was composed by A. R. Rahman, marking his second collaboration with Atlee after Mersal, and also his fifth collaboration with Vijay. The album features five songs with lyrics written by Vivek. The music rights of the film were acquired by Sony Music India. Actor Vijay, sung one song titled "Verithanam" which was confirmed by a poster release on 8 July 2019. This is the first time Vijay, has sung for a film composed by Rahman.

A song from the film "Singappenney" was unofficially leaked through the internet on mid-July 2019; and following this, the song was officially released on 23 July 2019, as the film's first single. The music video features Rahman and Shashaa Tirupati, rendering the song while lyricist Vivek and Atlee also made an appearance. Singapenney, considered to be a woman anthem, Vivek, who wrote the lyrics, stated that "This is a woman anthem, dedicated to mother, sister, wife and all women in the world" while also noting that "the song will change the stereotype of a woman, which considers that the stronger themes were denoted for men and the softer themes were denoted for women".

The second single track "Verithanam" was released on 1 September 2019, it is a peppy introduction dance number sung by Vijay. The lyrical video crossed 1 million likes within few days of its release, thus becoming the first South Indian lyric video to achieve this record. The third single "Unakkaga" was released on 18 September 2019, sung by Sreekanth Hariharan and Madhura Dhara Talluri, it is a melodious number. The other songs were "Maathare" sung by Chinmayi, Madhura Dhara Talluri, Sireesha, Akshara and Vithusayni, and "Bigil Bigil Bigiluma" an instrumental track.

Release
The film's music was released at the audio launch event held on 27 September 2019 at Sai Leo Muthu Indoor Stadium, Sri Sai Ram Engineering College, Chennai, with the presence of the film's cast and crew and all the other celebrities. Nayanthara did not attend the audio launch, the event was hosted by Mirchi Siva and Ramya Subramanian. Rahman and his musical team gave a stage performance at the audio launch. The event was not telecasted live, due to technical difficulties, the audio launch was telecasted through Sun TV on 29 September 2019. The songs were released at all digital platforms, the very same day, of the launch.

A month after the film's release, an album with two additional songs was released. While these two songs are also written by Vivek, the song "Kaalame" was sung by Bamba Bakya, while the song "Idharkuthaan" was sung by Dhee with additional vocals from Sunitha Sarathy and Arjun Chandy.

Track listing

Reception 
The music received positive reviews from critics, with "Singappenney", "Verithanam" and "Bigil Bigil Bigiluma" being well received by audiences. Behindwoods gave the album a rating of 3.25 out of 5, saying, "A. R. Rahman's perfect mix of class and mass music amplifies Bigil's verithanam [grandeur]!". International Business Times gave the album a rating of 3 out of 5, saying, "A. R. Rahman delivered a hit music album for Vijay in the form of Bigil". Moviecrow rated the album 3 out of 5, stating "A.R.Rahman's third successive collaboration with Vijay and fifth over the years is an amusing mix. Between an elastic spectrum of staying true to the likes of ARR and satisfying the monstrous hungry of the fans of a huge stardom, the album is more of a mixbag balancing both. Sometimes ARR overtakes and sometimes he gets ruthlessly overtaken."

Chart performance
The song "Singappenney" reached #1 position on Radio Mirchi Top 20, Wynk Music, YouTube, Spotify and JioSaavn music platforms. On year-end chart, the song reached #1 position in Big FM "Best of 2019" chart; and also achieved #10 on The Times of India's "Top 15 Tamil Songs 2019", charts, as "Verithanam", other song from the film, achieved #5 as well. "Singappenney" was also listed in "5 best songs to cheer womenhood on International Women's Day" by News18.

The album was listed in Top 2019 Tamil albums of Sify and The New Indian Express. A review from A Humming Heart, ranked the album in 8th position in their Top 15 Tamil Albums. On a January–September 2019 survey report from the music platform JioSaavn, stated "Verithanam" and "Rowdy Baby" (a song from Dhanush's Maari 2), became the most streamed songs in this intermediate period. In September 2020, the song "Verithanam" crossed 100 million views on YouTube.

 Weekly charts

 Year-end charts

Album credits

Original Soundtrack 
Credits adapted from the official website of Sony Music South.

Producer(s) 
A. R. Rahman

Songwriter(s) 

 A. R. Rahman (Composer & Arranger)
 Vivek, Rakendu Mouli (Lyrics)

Performer(s) 
A. R. Rahman, Vijay, Shashaa Tirupati, Sreekanth Hariharan, Madhura Dhara Talluri, Chinmayi, Sireesha, Akshara, Vithusayni, Bamba Bakya, Dhee, Arjun Chandy, Sunitha Sarathy, Sarath Santhosh, L. V. Revanth, Anurag Kulkarni

Musician(s) 

 Guitar - Keba Jeremiah, Joseph Vijay
 Flute - Naveen Kumar, Kareem Kamalakhar, Rasika Shekhar
 Tabla - Sai Shravanam
 Shenai - Balesh 
 Veena - Punya Srinivas
 Nadaswaram - D. Balasubramani
 Pakhawaj - Satya Narayanan 
 Sarangi - Manonmani 
 Clarinet & Saxophone - Sax Raja
 Live Rhythms - V. Kumar, T Raja, Vedha, Lakshmi Narayanan, Raju, Vikram, Hariprasadh, Ranjit, Krishna Kishore, P Guberan, Vetri, Pyare Lal
 Strings - Sunshine Orchestra (conducted by V. J. Srinivasamurthy), Chennai Strings Orchestra (conducted by R. Prabhakar), Macedonian Symphonic Orchestra (conducted by Oleg Kontradenko, Dzijan Emin)

Additional vocals 
Sangeetha, Poovaiyar, Ka Ka Balachander, KR Arjun, Rakthaksh, Hriday Gattani, Hiral Viradia

Backing Vocals 
Arjun Chandy, Veena Murali, Deepthi Suresh, Rakshita Suresh, Abinaya, Ala B Bala, Sowmya, Soundarya, Nakul Abhyankar, Deepak, Niranjana Ramanan, Swagatha, Aravind Srinivas, Jithin Raj, Shenbagaraj, Santosh Hariharan, Vignesh Narayanan, Lavita Lobo, Madhura Dhara Talluri, Narayanan

Kids Vocals 
Riya K S, Nikhil P S, K R Arjun, Vidhya Rupini, K U Kokilapriya

Vocal Arrangement

Arjun Chandy, Nakul Abhyankar, Kumaran Sivamani

Personnel 
Music Supervisors

T. R. Krishna Chetan

Additional Arrangements and Programming

T. R. Krishna Chetan, Jerry Silvester Vincent, Pawan CH, Santosh Dayanidhi, Kumaran Sivamani, Jim Sathya

Sound Engineers 

 Panchathan Record Inn, Chennai - T. R. Krishna Chetan, Suresh Permal, Karthik Sekaran, Suryansh, Barath, Riyasdeen Riyan, Nakul Abhyankar, Kumaran Sivamani
 AM Studios, Chennai - S. Sivakumar, Kannan Ganpat, Pradeep Menon, Krishnan Subramaniyan, Manoj Raman, Aravind MS

Production 

 Musicians Fixer - R. Samidurai
 Musician Coordinators - T. M. Faizuddin, Abdul Hayum Siddique
 Mixed by - T. R. Krishna Chetan, P. A. Deepak, Pradvay Sivashankar, Jerry Silvester Vincent, Pradeep Baskaran
 Mastered by - Suresh Permal
 Mastered for iTunes - S. Sivakumar

Original Score 
Credits adapted from the official website of Sony Music South.

Producer 
A. R. Rahman

Orchestra 

 Orchestra conductor
 Fames Macedonian Symphonic Orchestra - Oleg Kontradenko, Dzijan Emin
 Sunshine Orchestra - V. J. Srinivasamurthy
 Chennai Strings Orchestra - R. Prabhakar
 Sound Engineer - Alen Hadzi Stefanov
 Protocol Operator - Koca Davicodenic, Igor Vasilev
 Stage Manager - Ilija Grkovski, Teodora Arsovska
 Orchestrator - Joaquim Badia
 Additional Orchestration - Neelesh Mandalapu
 Orchestra Coordination - Andrew T. Mackay (for Bohemia Junction)

Instruments 

 Guitar - Keba Jeremiah, Sunil Milner, Chris Jason
 Flute - Naveen Kumar, Kareem Kamalakhar
 Shenai - Balesh 
 Veena - Punya Srinivas
 Nadaswaram - D. Balasubramani
 Violin - Suresh Lalwani, Vignesh
 Cello - Balaji, Sekar
 Sarangi - Manonmani 
 Live Rhythms - V. Kumar, T Raja, Vedha, Lakshmi Narayanan, Raju, Vikram, Hariprasadh, Ranjit, Krishna Kishore, P Guberan, Vetri, Pyare Lal
 Strings - Sunshine Orchestra (conducted by V J Srinivasa Murthy), Chennai Strings Orchestra (conducted by R. Prabhakar), Macedonian Symphonic Orchestra (conducted by Oleg Kontradenko, Dzijan Emin)

Additional vocals 
Arjun Chandy, Veena Murali, Deepthi Suresh, Hiral Viradia, Reema, Uthara Unnikrishnan, Rakshita Suresh, Abinaya, Ala B Bala, Sowmya, Soundarya, Nakul Abhyankar, Deepak, Niranjana Ramanan, Swagatha, Aravind Srinivas, Jithin Raj, Shenbagaraj, Santosh Hariharan, Vignesh Narayanan, Lavita Lobo, Madhura Dhara Talluri, Narayanan, Sana Moussa, Tanvi, Shiv

Personnel 
Music Supervisor

T. R. Krishna Chetan

Additional Programming and Arrangement

Jim Sathya, Nakul Abhyankar, Pawan CH, A. R. Ameen, AH Kaashif, Jerry Vincent, Santhosh Dhayanidhi, Harsha Vardhan Upadrashta, Chitti, Ramesh

Sound Engineers 

 Panchathan Record Inn, Chennai - T. R. Krishna Chetan, Suresh Permal, Karthik Sekaran, Suryansh, Barath, Riyasdeen Riyan, Nakul Abhyankar, Kumaran Sivamani
 AM Studios, Chennai - S. Sivakumar, Kannan Ganpat, Pradeep Menon, Krishnan Subramaniyan, Manoj Raman, Aravind MS
 KM Music Conservatory, Chennai - Harsha Vardhan Upadrashta, Aravind Crescendo

Production 

 Musicians Fixer - R. Samidurai
 Musician Coordinators - T. M. Faizuddin, Abdul Hayum Siddique
 Stereo Mixing - S. Sivakumar, Pradvay Sivashankar

References

External links 
Bigil (soundtrack) at the Internet Movie Database

2019 soundtrack albums
Tamil film soundtracks
A. R. Rahman soundtracks
Sony Music India soundtracks